The Kozerki Open is a tournament for professional female tennis players. The event is classified as a $60,000 ITF Women's World Tennis Tour tournament and has been held in Grodzisk Mazowiecki, Poland, on outdoor hardcourts since 2019. Starting in 2022, a male version of the tournament was held as part of the ATP Challenger Tour.

Past finals

Men's singles

Men's doubles

Women's singles

Women's doubles

External links
 ITF search
 Official website

ATP Challenger Tour
ITF Women's World Tennis Tour
Hard court tennis tournaments
Tennis tournaments in Poland
2019 establishments in Poland